Society for Czechoslovak Philately (SCP) is a philatelic organization dedicated to the collection and  study of the postage stamps and postal history of Czechoslovakia, the Czech Republic and Slovakia.

History
The society was founded in 1939 and was intended to draw attention to the importance of Czechoslovakian philately by attracting and serving the beginning stamp collector as well as the advanced specialist of Czechoslovakian philately and postal history. The society was founded as the Czechoslovak Philatelic Society, but later was renamed the Society for Czechoslovak Philately. It currently serves collectors of Czechoslovakian philately in thirty five American states and seventeen other countries.

Membership
The SCP offers membership at four levels: regular, patron, honorary, and youth. Membership may be obtained by applying at the SCP website.

Services
Among other services, the SCP offers a sales circuit where members may purchase stamps or sell off their duplicates, an expertization service for Czechoslovakian stamps, and a library of philatelic books in various languages.

Publications
The society journal is The Czechoslovak Specialist, which has been published continually since the inception of the society in 1939. The journal is published quarterly, and an index of previous articles is available.

Philatelic exhibitions
Traditionally an annual meeting, connected with a major philatelic exhibition, is held by the society yearly in the United States. In 1998, the society held its first formal meeting outside the United States in Prague at the PRAGA 98 philatelic exhibition.

Organization
The SCP is governed by a set of bylaws. Administration of the society is provided by an elected group of personnel, consisting of: President, Vice-president, Secretary, and Treasurer. The president is entitled to name offices of editor, librarian, American Philatelic Society Representative, circuit manager, auditing chairman, and such other committee chairpersons and staff members as needed.

See also
Postage stamps and postal history of Czechoslovakia
Postage stamps and postal history of the Czech Republic
Postage stamps and postal history of Slovakia

References
 Society for Czechoslovak Philately

External links 
Czechoslovak Philatelic Society of Great Britain
Stamp Domain Czech pages.

Philatelic organizations based in the United States